Alfred Wilkinson (2 January 1863 – 22 January 1922) was an Australian cricketer. He played in four first-class matches for South Australia between 1885 and 1893.

See also
 List of South Australian representative cricketers

References

External links
 

1863 births
1922 deaths
Australian cricketers
South Australia cricketers
Cricketers from Adelaide